The 2016–17 FC Orenburg season is the club's first season in the Russian Premier League, the highest tier of association football in Russia.

Squad

On loan

Reserve squad

Transfers

Summer

In:

Out:

}

Winter

In:

Out:

Competitions

Russian Premier League

Results by round

Matches

League table

Relegation play-offs

Russian Cup

Squad statistics

Appearances and goals

|-
|colspan="14"|Players away from the club on loan:

|-
|colspan="14"|Players who left Orenburg during the season:

|}

Goal scorers

Disciplinary record

References

External links
Official website

FC Orenburg seasons
Orenburg